Boronia citrata, commonly known as lemon boronia, is a plant in the citrus family, Rutaceae and is endemic to Victoria. It is an erect, woody shrub with pinnate, strongly lemon-scented leaves and pale pink to rosy pink, four-petalled flowers arranged in groups of up to five.

Description
The flowers are pale pink to rosy pink, and arranged singly or in groups of up to five in leaf axils or on the end of the branches. The eight stamens are hairy but the style is smooth.

Taxonomy and naming
Boronia citrata was first formally described in 1993 by Neville Grant Walsh and the description was published in Muelleria from a specimen collected near Licola. The specific epithet (citrata) is derived from the Latin word citratus meaning "lemon-like", referring to the lemon scent of this species. Boronia citriodora is also known as "lemon boronia" but is endemic to New South Wales.

Distribution and habitat
This boronia grows in subalpine mallee and heath. It is only known from the upper catchment of the Macalister River, north and east of Licola.

References

citrata
Flora of Victoria (Australia)
Plants described in 1993
Taxa named by Neville Grant Walsh